Steve McClure (born March 8, 1984) is a Republican member of the Illinois Senate for the 50th District who serves as Assistant Leader and Assistant Floor Leader for the Senate Republican Caucus. The 50th District, located in Central Illinois, includes all of Calhoun, Greene, Morgan, Pike, and Scott counties as well as portions of Macoupin, Madison, Jersey, and Sangamon counties. Before his election to the Illinois State Senate, McClure was a prosecutor for nearly six years in the Sangamon County State's Attorney's Office in Springfield, Illinois, where he was chief of the Juvenile Division, and later served in the Felony Division.

Early life and education
McClure was born on March 8, 1984, in Springfield, Illinois. His father, Steve McClure, Sr., was Director of Commerce for the state of Illinois under Governor James R. Thompson and his mother, Tammy McClure, was the Director of Personnel for Governor Jim Edgar when he was Illinois Secretary of State. He has an older sister, Katie, and a younger brother, Matt. McClure went to Springfield High School where he was co-captain of the wrestling team, and had a record of 26-4 as a senior. He graduated from Arizona State University with degrees in political science and history, and was vice chair of the Arizona College Republicans. After college, McClure worked on the Illinois Senate Republican appropriations staff. While working for the Senate Republicans, he earned a master's degree in political studies from the University of Illinois at Springfield. He went on to attend Valparaiso University School of Law where he graduated with a Juris Doctor and served as president of the Valparaiso Law School Republicans. After law school, McClure served as a prosecutor for nearly six years in the Sangamon County State's Attorney's Office in Springfield, Illinois where he was chief of the Juvenile Division, and later served in the Felony Division.

Elections
In August 2017, the Sangamon County Republicans endorsed McClure for Illinois Senate in the 50th District for the 2018 Republican primary, instead of incumbent state Senator Sam McCann. This was a change from the previous Republican primary, when the Sangamon County Republicans supported Sam McCann. In that 2016 election, McCann won a tough primary despite being opposed by sitting Republican Governor Bruce Rauner. In September 2017, McClure resigned his position as an assistant state's attorney and officially launched his campaign. In December 2017, Senator McCann announced that he would not seek reelection. McClure then ran unopposed in the primary and in the general election. In April 2018, Sam McCann announced his candidacy for governor as a third-party candidate. In February 2021, McCann was indicted by a federal grand jury for charges related to his alleged misuse of campaign money for personal expenses.

In October 2021, McClure announced his candidacy for reelection in the newly drawn 54th Legislative District, which was mostly new territory for McClure. The 54th District contains all or parts of Christian, Cumberland, Effingham, Macon, Macoupin, Menard, Montgomery, Sangamon, and Shelby counties. McClure was challenged in the Republican primary by Donald Debolt, who gave $200,000 to his own campaign. Additionally, Debolt was endorsed by state Senator Darren Bailey, who became the Republican nominee for governor that year. McClure defeated Debolt by nearly 20 points.

Illinois Senate
McClure was sworn into the Illinois Senate on January 9, 2019. His first bill that became law was legislation that allowed for special license plates to raise awareness and funds for pediatric cancer research. In 2020, McClure and state Representative Avery Bourne passed legislation that made it illegal to post unauthorized private compromising images of another person online and created a court process to allow for a victim to have the images taken down with an emergency order and to recover damages. In 2021, McClure became a member of Senate Republican leadership when he was appointed Assistant Republican Leader and Assistant Floor Leader for the Senate Republican Caucus. Later in 2021, McClure introduced and passed legislation to address the Illinois public school teacher shortage and COVID-19 student learning gap. He also passed legislation with state Representative C.D. Davidsmeyer to make it easier for veterans to get seasonal work at the Illinois Department of Transportation. In 2022, McClure and Davidsmeyer passed legislation to help schools hire bus drivers.

DCFS legislation
In January 2022, Illinois Department of Children and Family Services investigator Deidre Silas was stabbed to death while she was visiting a home in rural Sangamon County to check on the safety of children. At the time of her murder, DCFS investigators were not allowed to carry any defensive tools with them, including pepper spray. In 2017, DCFS investigator Pamela Knight was murdered by a man who pushed her to the ground and kicked her in the head while she was attempting to take a child into protective custody. In response to these murders, McClure filed legislation to allow DCFS frontline workers to carry pepper spray and establish a new self-defense training course that would include instruction on the proper use of pepper spray in emergency situations. The bill was signed into law by Governor J.B. Pritzker on May 27, 2022.

Prisoner Review Board
During Governor J.B. Pritzker's first years in office, the Illinois Prisoner Review Board, a 15-person body appointed by the Governor and confirmed by the State Senate, began voting to release very controversial inmates on parole. However, nine members of the Prisoner Review Board were never voted on or confirmed by the Senate. The Illinois Constitution required these nine appointments to be confirmed by the Senate after 60 session days. However, Governor Pritzker was allowing them to serve for up to 59 days, withdrawing their appointments, and then reappointing them days later, which reset the clock and circumvented the Senate. The Senate, made up of a super majority of members of Governor Pritzker's party, chose not to call any of the appointments to be confirmed.

Some of the controversial inmates that the Prisoner Review Board voted to release during this period include the Starved Rock Killer, child murderer and rapist Ray Larson (originally sentenced to 100–300 years in prison), double murderer and rapist Paul Bryant (originally sentenced to 500 to 1,500 years in prison), and Johnny Veal who murdered two police officers (originally sentenced to 100 to 199 years in prison).

After the Illinois Prisoner Review Board began making these controversial releases of prisoners, McClure, along with Senators Jason Plummer and Terri Bryant, led the efforts to have unconfirmed members of the board receive a vote in the State Senate. McClure, Plummer, and Bryant, who were the only Republicans on the Senate Executive Appointments Committee tasked with vetting all gubernatorial appointments, held a press conference in May 2021 to demand that Governor Pritzker's Prisoner Review Board appointments face a vote in that committee. One of Governor Pritzker's more recent appointments to the Board at the time of the press conference was Max Cerda, a community activist who was also a convicted double murderer. Despite numerous attempts to force the Prisoner Review Board appointments to receive a vote in the Senate, the Democratic majority refused to call the appointments for a vote. The controversy came to a head when McClure had the chance to question the chair of the Prisoner Review Board in an unrelated appropriations committee hearing in March 2022. McClure asked several times if the convicted double murderer serving unconfirmed on the Prisoner Review Board had been voting to release people that he served time with in the Department of Corrections, among other questions. The day after McClure's questions in committee, Governor Pritzker withdrew the appointment of Max Cerda from the Prisoner Review Board. In the two weeks that followed, other unconfirmed members of the Prisoner Review Board were finally called before the Senate.

After a contentious Senate Executive Appointments Committee hearing in which several Prisoner Review Board appointments faced scrutiny for the first time, one member of the Board resigned, two members were confirmed, and two others were rejected by the full Senate. When Prisoner Review Board member Eleanor Wilson, the final Prisoner Review Board member to be rejected by the Senate, was voted on, she only received 15 confirmation votes out of 59 senators. During McClure's floor speech advocating for Wilson to be rejected, he stated that, "We need to protect the public. And we need to stick up for victims and their families, no matter where they are in this state.” The Senate did confirm two new members of the Board in the final hours of session so that the Board would have a quorum.

Committee assignments
McClure currently serves on the following committees: Criminal Law (Minority Spokesperson); Agriculture; Energy and Public Utilities; Executive Appointments; Local Government; Transportation; App- Criminal Justice (Sub-Minority Spokesperson); App-Health; Redistricting; Redistricting- Chicago South; Redistricting- Southwestern IL; Redistricting- West Central IL (Sub-Minority Spokesperson); Criminal Law- Juvenile Court; Problem- Solving Courts.

References

External links
 Steve McClure for Senate official campaign site

21st-century American politicians
Republican Party Illinois state senators
Politicians from Springfield, Illinois
Living people
1984 births
Valparaiso University School of Law alumni